Muratbağı can refer:

 Muratbağı, Kovancılar
 Muratbağı, Horasan